S. Mark Young holds the George Bozanic and Holman G. Hurt Chair in Sports and Entertainment Business in the Marshall School of Business at the University of Southern California. He is also a Professor of Accounting in the Leventhal School of Accounting, part of the Marshall School of Business, and has a courtesy appointment as Professor of Journalism and Communication (USC Annenberg School for Journalism and Communication) and Professor Management and Organization in the Marshall School. Young teaches and does research in the areas of management accounting and control in a variety of contexts but mostly recently in the entertainment industry. Young is a Distinguished Fellow at the Center for Excellence in Teaching at USC and has won several international research. mentoring and teaching awards and the Mellon Foundation Mentoring Award. He has published over 40 academic papers in academic journals. In 2020, the Management Accounting Section of the American Accounting Association awarded him the Lifetime Achievement Award in Management Accounting. Previously, Young received the Notable Contribution to the Accounting Literature (with S. Anderson) and the Notable Contribution to the Management Accounting Literature three times with various coauthors including F. Selto, S. Anderson and F. Du and G. Tang.

As avid high school and college tennis player, Young also serves as the Historian for USC Men's Tennis Team - the team with the most NCAA Championships (21) in men's collegiate tennis. Recently, Young published, Trojan Tennis: A History of the Storied Men's Tennis Team at the University of Southern California (New Chapter Books, 2018).

Dr. Young has also done research on popular culture and his interests led to a collaboration with Mike Richardson (Dark Horse Entertainment's President) and Steve Duin (columnist for The Oregonian newspaper), on Blast Off! Rockets, Robots, Ray Guns and Rarities from the Golden Age of Space Toys (Dark Horse Books, 2001). The book is a history of the role and influence of space toys on society through the late 1950s. Dr. Gene Metcalf, well-known author of Raygun, called Blast Off! "the definitive book on the history of space toys." Blast Off! has been used a reference for sci-fi movies including Sky Captain and the World of Tomorrow.

In 2006 Young and Loveline 's Dr. Drew Pinsky published a study entitled Narcissism and Celebrity in the Journal of Research in Personality (October 2006). While most information about celebrities is anecdotal, this paper was the first to directly gather actual data from celebrities. The paper gained worldwide attention, appearing in over 150 major news and entertainment websites and newspapers worldwide. The study was also included as part of the New York Times Magazine's special issue, The Year in Ideas for 2006. In 2009 Young and Pinsky's book, The Mirror Effect: How Celebrity Narcissism is Seducing America, was published by Harper Collins (New York). The Mirror Effect is the process by which the narcissistic behaviors of celebrities have become normalized by the relentless onslaught of celebrity news by every kind of media. Everyone in today’s society is being fed a steady diet of narcissistic images and behaviors including hypersexuality (e.g., making sex tapes), alcohol and drug abuse, body image issues (e.g. eating disorders, excessive tattoos and piercings, extensive elective plastic surgery) and self-harming (behaviors such as those you would see on shows such as Jackass.)  The most vulnerable audience, tweens, teens and young adults, immersed in the coverage of these behaviors, is now reflecting them back by participating in reality television shows or through their postings on social networking sites. The book discusses the rise of narcissism among today's youth, its consequences and what parents and society in general can do to combat this disturbing trend. The book is a New York Times and LA Times Best Seller and has been widely quoted.

Young has been interviewed on the H3H3 Podcast, The View, Howard Stern, Showbiz Tonight, Fox Business, the Reelz Channel, Laura Ingraham's radio show, Fox's Strategy Room, Marketplace, National Public Radio, ABC News Now, CNN's Situation Room and the KTLA Morning News, and appears in documentaries on entertainment including, Heckler (produced by Mike Addis and Jamie Kennedy), Inside Hollywood, Killer Comebacks, the Reelz Channel's Hollywood Scandals, and the DVD Blu-ray Extras for the Bling Ring film. He has  been quoted in The Times, London, The Economist, The Financial Times, Bloomberg BusinessWeek, Newsweek, Daily Variety,  Scientific American Mind, the LA Times, Premiere Magazine, The New York Daily News, Maclean's, The New York Times Magazine, China Daily, Allure, Men's Fitness, Newsweek, Forbes and many other business and entertainment publications.

Young was born in Sydney, Australia and attended Homebush Primary and High Schools. After he and his family moved to the United States, he graduated from Thomas Worthington High School. He holds an A.B. degree in Economics from Oberlin College, a Master's of Accounting degree from The Ohio State University, and holds a Ph.D. in Accounting from the University of Pittsburgh.

External links
 S. Mark Young at USC's Marshall School of Business

Living people
Oberlin College alumni
University of Southern California faculty
People from Sydney
Year of birth missing (living people)